Teri Rofkar, or Chas' Koowu Tla'a (1956–2016), was a Tlingit weaver and educator from Sitka, Alaska. She specialized in Ravenstail (Raven's Tail) designs and spruce root baskets.

Rofkar was born on September 27, 1956 in San Rafael, California and grew up in Pelican and Anchorage, Alaska. In 1976 she moved to Sitka, Alaska, the town her grandmother was born in, raising three children with her husband Denny Rofkar. She died on December 2, 2016 at age 60.

Rofkar learned weaving from her grandmother Eliza Monk, as well as Delores Churchill (Haida), Ernestine Hanlon-Abel (Tlingit) and Cheryl Samuel. She began her professional career as a weaver in 1986. She wove the first Tlingit robe made completely from mountain goat wool in more than two hundred years, but also worked with contemporary materials and technology.

Methods of weaving
Rofkar specialized in twinning, a method of weaving, and a 6,000 year old practice. This method employed freehand looming, a long, continuous process that involves creating baskets and ceremonial robes from the roots of spruce trees.

Activist life
Aside from her artwork, Rofkar was a community educator and researcher through her work as an artist and weaver. Throughout her life she cultivated awareness surrounding traditional Native American crafts by expanding the discourse surrounding them to include new stories and perspectives. Through this, Rokfar connected the histories of native people to the broader global community.

Collections on display
Rofkar's works can be seen on display at the National Museum of the American Indian in Washington, D.C. and the Museum of the North in Fairbanks, Alaska.

Awards and honors
 In 2004, Rofkar won the Governor's Award for Native Art in Alaska. 
 In 2006, she was selected for a USA Fellowship from United States Artists in the Crafts and Traditional Arts category. 
 She was a recipient of a 2009 National Heritage Fellowship awarded by the National Endowment for the Arts, which is the United States government's highest honor in the folk and traditional arts.
 In 2012, she received the Creative Capital Visual Arts Award.
 In 2013, she received both the Distinguished Artist Award from the Rasmuson Foundation and a Native Arts & Cultures Foundation Artist Fellowship.
 Rofkar also received an Ecotrust Indigenous Leadership Award (date unknown).

References

External links
 
 Teri Rofkar, Rasmuson Foundation Distinguished Artist 2013 (video)

1956 births
2016 deaths
20th-century Native Americans
21st-century Native Americans
American weavers
Artists from Alaska
National Heritage Fellowship winners
Native American basket weavers
Native American textile artists
Northwest Coast art
Tlingit people
People from Sitka, Alaska
Women basketweavers
Women textile artists
20th-century Native American women
21st-century Native American women